Jerry Lee Atwood (born 1942) is an American supramolecular chemist. He is currently a Curators' Distinguished Professor in Chemistry at the University of Missouri. He is an international leader in Supramolecular chemistry. He has developed the field by his research and by writing a text book on Supramolecular Chemistry.

Education and early life

Jerry Atwood was born in Springfield, Missouri. He attended Southwest Missouri State College, graduating with a bachelor's of science degree in 1964. He received his PhD from the University of Illinois at Urbana–Champaign in 1968.

Career and research

Atwood was appointed as an assistant professor at the University of Alabama and was named a full professor in 1978. In 1994, he was appointed as a chair and professor in the Department of Chemistry with the University of Missouri.

Awards and honors

Atwood is a recipient of the most prestigious Izatt-Christensen International Macrocyclic Chemistry Award. He has also received an honorary doctor of science degree  from the University of South Florida. Atwood also received an honor PREFACE from the  University of Georgia.

References 

1942 births
Living people
21st-century American chemists
20th-century American chemists
University of Missouri faculty
Missouri State University alumni
University of Illinois Urbana-Champaign alumni
University of Alabama faculty
People from Springfield, Missouri
People from Columbia, Missouri
Chemists from Missouri